The 1880 Radnor Boroughs by-election was a parliamentary by-election held for the House of Commons constituency of Radnor Boroughs in Wales on 17 May 1880.

Vacancy
The by-election was caused by the resignation of the sitting Liberal MP, Spencer Cavendish who was also elected MP for North East Lancashire and opted to sit there, causing a by-election.

Candidates
Two candidates nominated.

The Liberal Party nominated former Acting Governor of Grenada Samuel Williams.

The Conservative Party nominated a soldier, Cecil Alfred Tufton Otway.

Results

References

1880 elections in the United Kingdom
By-elections to the Parliament of the United Kingdom in Welsh constituencies
1880 in Wales
1880s elections in Wales
May 1880 events